Wildwood Imperium: The Wildwood Chronicles, Book Three is a 2014 children's fantasy novel by The Decemberists' singer-songwriter Colin Meloy, illustrated by his wife Carson Ellis. The novel, the second sequel to Wildwood: The Wildwood Chronicles, Book One, continues the tale of Prue McKeel and her adventures in the "Impassable Wilderness," a fantastical version of Portland, Oregon's Forest Park. The natural beauty and local color of the city figure prominently. It was released on February 4, 2014.

Plot
PART ONE: In South Wood, a young girl named Zita is crowned May Queen. That night, she and several friends conduct a secret ritual meant to call up the legendary spirit of the Verdant Empress. Instead, they accidentally call up the spirit of Alexandra, the Dowager Governess. The other girls run away, but the Governess begins sending Zita nightly messages instructing her to bring the spirit 3 things: an eagle feather, a pebble from beside a stream in Wildwood, and the teeth of the Governess' son, Alexei (the teeth are in his entombed mechanical body and were used for bringing him back to life the first time). Zita is mourning her recently deceased mother, and decides to help the Governess because she can feel her grieving over her own dead son.

The new Elder Mystic, the young boy who was an acolyte in the last book, accompanies other Mystics deep into Wildwood to hang a flag remembering Iphigenia on the Ossuary Tree there (oddly, this journey takes "many days", although Prue and her army traversed the same distance in a couple of hours in the first book). Afterward, the Elder Mystic follows a pattern in the trees and is suddenly swallowed by the ground, disappearing forever.

Meanwhile, Esben the bear has been staying with Prue and her family in Portland. He and Prue head back to the Impassable Wilderness to carry out the wishes of the Great Tree and try to bring Alexei back to life again.  Leaving Esben hiding in the woods, Prue goes to South Wood to ask the government for help. She is shocked to find that people are being executed in the name of the "Bicycle Maiden" and her coup, and that a new set of Caliphs who worship the Blighted Tree of South Wood are gaining control (they feed the substance that is covering the Blighted Tree – Spongiform - to people, and it makes them obedient to the Tree's wishes). It turns out that the mysterious Roger Swindon himself is the head of these Caliphs, and that they have assimilated all of the Wildwood Bandits into their number. The people of South Wood angrily turn on Prue when she tells them that they need to reanimate Alexei.

Rachel and Elsie and all of the other former orphans of Unthank's Home have taken refuge in a warehouse in the Industrial Wastes, where they are hiding out from Roger Swindon and his stevedores. They soon ally themselves with a beret-wearing, French-speaking group of men who call themselves the Chapeaux Noir. The Chapeaux Noir are dedicated to bringing down the Titans of Industry who run the Industrial Wastes. Their leader, Jacques, was once one of the Titans but was betrayed by his fellows, who absorbed his industry into their own. They find another unlikely ally in Joffrey Unthank, who has gone mad and is living like a hobo. Together they plan an assault on Titan Tower, where the blind Maker Carol and orphan Martha are being held captive.

PART TWO: After she refuses to eat the Spongiform when the Blighted Tree Caliphs offer it to her, Prue is taken by soldiers and imprisoned on the Crag, an island fortress in the ocean. She is accompanied by the former Bandit Seamus, whose affliction she ended when she used her mastery over plants to pull the Spongiform out of his nose.

The Unadoptables and the Chapeaux Noir assault Titan Tower with explosives while Elsie and several others of the smaller children crawl through the air ducts and free Carol and Martha. Titan Bradley Wigman shoots and kills Joffrey Unthank (who dies in the arms of his beloved Desdemona) and Roger Swindon is then taken captive by the fleeing orphans. Rejoined by Rachel and one of the Chapeaux Noir named Nico, they head into the Impassable Wilderness while the Industrial Wastes explode behind them. 
Zita finishes gathering the three items the Governess' spirit has tasked her to find and performs a ritual that brings the Governess, in the form of a giant ivy woman, back to life.

PART THREE: A chapter is devoted to telling of an owl who after having not left his own tree for years, decides to construct a model of the Eiffel Tower from a photo on a postcard given to him by a squirrel. When he completes it, it is knocked over by the encroaching enchanted Ivy that the Dowager Governess has unleashed anew. The owl then disappears from the story completely.
 
The orphans, Nico, Carol and Roger Swindon find themselves ensnared in a rope trap in Wildwood. Rachel and Elsie are shocked to see who has laid it: their missing brother Curtis. Unable to discover what happened to his fellow Bandits, Curtis has recreated the Bandit's Hideout in the trees (in only a few weeks and assisted only by the rat Septimus, Curtis has constructed an elaborate fortress hundreds of feet up in the trees).

Prue and Seamus are rescued from the Crag by Owl Rex and some of his Avian subjects, who then take them to South Wood, where they find a repentant Zita and Esben the bear. Since they still do not know where the other Maker, Carol, is, Esben begins trying to make the Mobius Cog with the help of Seamus. The Ivy has already overtaken all of South Wood and all of its other residents have been put to sleep underneath it. Prue uses her abilities to pull the Ivy off of the Wildwood Bandits – including the Bandit King, Brendan - and then removes the Spongiform through their noses, freeing them from their spell.

Curtis, his sisters and Carol are chased by Ivy Giants created by Alexandra, and the Ivy overtakes the new Bandit's Hideout. Nico is overtaken by the Ivy, as is the wooden cell where they have imprisoned Roger Swindon but the rest are rescued and carried to safety at the last moment by Avians being ridden by Brendan and the Wildwood Bandits. They fly to North Wood, where Prue is already gathering the animals and farmers to make a stand against the Ivy.

When they realize that Carol is the other Maker, he is quickly flown back to South Wood and reunited with his old friend Esben. Together, the two Makers reconstruct the Mobius Cog. Once Zita provides them with Alexei's teeth, they bring him back to life once again in his mechanical body, but he is despondent upon being forced back to artificial life. They manage to convince him that he is needed to stop his mother, and he agrees to do so only if Zita will remove the Cog and let him die again once he has stopped her. She agrees.

Prue, the Bandits and the reformed Wildwood Irregulars are joined by the Avians in battling the Ivy, but they are overrun by Ivy birds and giants created by the Governess. The Ivy overtakes the Great Tree and splits it in two. This destroys the Periphery Bind, and the Ivy is unleashed upon the world. It tears down the remains of the Industrial Wastes and then covers Portland and puts all of its residents to sleep.

Alexei, in his mechanical body, arrives and approaches his Ivy mother, laying his head on her breast. He tells her that he forgives her for bringing him back to life. Her anger dissipates and she is finally set free. She disappears into the ground forever.

Prue climbs to the top of the destroyed Great Tree and uses her power to pull the Ivy, which is no longer enchanted, back from Portland and the Industrial Wastes, and then gathers it to her and orders it to fold itself into the ground. She then falls unconscious. The North Wood Mystics gather her up and set out with her in their arms to the Ossuary Tree in Wildwood (again, this journey takes many days). They are escorted by the Bandits. They lay Prue on the ground near a new sapling at the site where the Elder Mystic disappeared into the ground, and she is similarly swallowed up. The sapling, now known as the One Tree, sprouts a leaf, and the Periphery Bind is recreated.

Alexei decides to stay alive with Zita at his side and help to rule the new land that has been created now that the buildings of South Wood have been torn down by the Ivy. Roger Swindon is never found, having escaped his cell in the Bandit Hideout, but months later his Caliph robe is found outside a coyote warren. The orphans of the former Unthank Home are taken in by the Bandits and begin training to become Bandits themselves.

In Portland, Curtis and his sisters are reunited with their overjoyed parents, who have finally returned from searching for Curtis in Europe. They understand that Curtis has to return to his fellow Bandits, but because the whole family are "half-breeds" (it is never explained how this came about), they can visit him in Wildwood any time.

In Portland, Prue's parents get on with life with their son Mac but continue to mourn their lost daughter. One day, they find a sapling growing in their yard and begin to nurture it. It grows several feet a day, and then one morning is gone. In its place is Prue. She tells them of her adventures, and the whole family settles in for some hot chocolate.

Iconography and real-life locations
Much of the iconography and locales included in the Wildwood series are derived from real locations in Portland. A mysterious stone house included in one chapter references "The Witch Castle", a now abandoned public bathroom in Forest Park that was partially destroyed by the Columbus Day Storm in 1962. It is commonly used as a resting point by hikers and joggers on the park's Wildwood Trail and has been the subject of innumerable local legends over the years. Among them: it was once the homestead of the former owner of the park and/or it used to be the home of a real-life witch. Despite its true history, the house has been used in several occult ceremonies since the storm and is often visited by members of Portland's goth community.

Other real locations featured in the book include Pittock Mansion, the St Johns neighborhood, Forest Park and the Willamette River.

References

External links

 Official Website

Novels set in Portland, Oregon
American fantasy novels
American children's novels
American magic realism novels
Children's fantasy novels
2014 American novels
Balzer + Bray books
2014 children's books